The Ordre du Mérite militaire  (Order of Military Merit) was a ministerial order of merit of France created on 22 March 1957 to recognize the contributions of active members of the military reserves during times of peace. The order was administered and awarded the Ministry of Defence. The order was created to replace the Croix des services militaires volontaires established in 1934. Holders of the Cross were made members of the Ordre du Mérite militaire, bronze holders as knights, silver holders as officers, and gold holders as commanders.

The Order was deprecated by decree on 3 December 1963, and superseded by the Ordre national du Mérite. Extant members may continue to display their decorations.

Classes
The Order has three classes:
Commandeur (Commander)
Officier (Officer)
Chevalier (Knight)

References

External links

 

Mérite militaire
Mérite militaire
Awards established in 1957
1957 establishments in France
1963 disestablishments in France
Orders of merit
Awards disestablished in 1963